Midnight is a 1939 American screwball comedy film directed by Mitchell Leisen and starring Claudette Colbert, Don Ameche, John Barrymore, Francis Lederer, Mary Astor, and Elaine Barrie. Written by Charles Brackett and Billy Wilder and based on a story by Edwin Justus Mayer and Franz Schulz, the film is about an unemployed American showgirl stranded in Paris who is set up by a millionaire to break up his wife's affair with another man. In 2013, the film was selected for preservation in the United States National Film Registry by the Library of Congress as being "culturally, historically, or aesthetically significant".

Plot
American showgirl Eve Peabody (Claudette Colbert) arrives in Paris from Monte Carlo during a rainstorm with nothing but her clothes (an evening gown). With no money and no place to stay, she persuades soft-hearted Hungarian taxi driver Tibor Czerny (Don Ameche) to drive her to nightclubs looking for a job in exchange for her doubling his fare. After an unsuccessful search, Tibor buys her dinner and offers to let her stay overnight at his apartment while he finishes his night shift. While attracted to Tibor, she slips away.

Seeking shelter from the rain, Eve sneaks into a black tie classical concert. Without an admission card, she uses the pawn ticket for her suitcase. Stephanie (Hedda Hopper), the hostess, learns that an imposter got in using a pawn ticket, and interrupts the concert to ask if "Eve Peabody" is there. Eve tries to slip away, but is intercepted by Marcel Renaud (Rex O'Malley), who invites her to play bridge in another room. The other players are Madame Helene Flammarion (Mary Astor) and Jacques Picot (Francis Lederer), a wealthy ladies' man. Eve introduces herself as "Madame Czerny" and is partnered with Jacques.

Helene's husband, Georges (John Barrymore), enters the room and notices the woman who left during the search for the gatecrasher. Pretending to recognize Eve as the wife of "Baron Czerny", he chats with her. When the game ends, Eve and Jacques owe their opponents a few thousand francs. Eve thinks she must try to pass an IOU, but discovers 10,000 francs in her purse. Jacques insists on escorting her back to the Ritz, where she claims she is staying. Eve is stunned to find a lavish suite reserved for her.

Meanwhile, Tibor searches for her. He recruits his fellow taxi drivers by organizing a pool, where everyone puts in five francs and whoever finds Eve wins the money.

The next morning, Eve awakens to find that "her" luggage has arrived: a set of expensive trunks containing a complete wardrobe. Her car and chauffeur are waiting outside. Eve is mystified and frightened until Georges arrives, her mysterious benefactor. He explains that Helene and Jacques think they are in love. Last night, he noticed that Jacques had eyes only for the "Baroness". George proposes that Eve encourage Jacques and break up his affair with Helene. Georges will pay her well if she succeeds, and Jacques might even marry her. He gives her an expense account of fifty thousand francs and invites her to the Flammarion estate in Versailles for a weekend house party.

Jacques becomes thoroughly captivated by Eve. While driving to the party, the couple are spotted by one of the taxi drivers. He collects the prize money from Tibor, who cannot believe she is staying at the Ritz under his name. Meanwhile, Helene learns that Stefanie accused the wrong person of being the gatecrasher. Suspecting the "Baroness", Helene has Marcel retrieve Eve's suitcase.

At the Flammarion estate, Eve and Jacques arrive together, much to Helene's jealousy. When Marcel arrives with the suitcase, they search its contents and find a photograph of some showgirls, one of whom looks like the "Baroness". Helene is about to expose Eve when "Baron Tibor Czerny" is announced. Tibor informs the hosts that he has come to be with his "wife". Later in private, Tibor professes his love for Eve, who hints that she feels the same way, but she is still determined to marry for money.

The next morning, Eve suspects that Tibor is about to reveal his true identity, so she explains that the Czerny barons are prone to fits of delusional madness, a story confirmed by Georges. Tibor appears as a taxi driver, but the Flammarions simply humor him, and he walks away in anger. Jacques offers to help Eve get a divorce and then marry her.

Eve appears in court for a sham divorce. Although Tibor is angry with her, he accepts payment from Georges to go along. During the proceedings, however, Tibor pretends to be insane, knowing that this will prevent a divorce under French law. Finally cured of her infatuation, Helene leaves arm-in-arm with Georges, while Tibor and Eve head to the marriage bureau—much to the surprise of the judge who just denied their divorce.

Cast

 Claudette Colbert as Eve Peabody
 Don Ameche as Tibor Czerny
 John Barrymore as Georges Flammarion
 Francis Lederer as Jacques Picot
 Mary Astor as Helene Flammarion
 Elaine Barrie as Simone
 Hedda Hopper as Stephanie
 Rex O'Malley as Marcel Renaud
 Monty Woolley as The Judge
 Armand Kaliz as Lebon

Production
According to a Turner Classic Movies introduction by Robert Osborne, the role that eventually went to Claudette Colbert was originally slated for Barbara Stanwyck but scheduling problems prevented her from taking it. Osborne also stated Wilder was unhappy with script changes made by director Leisen, giving him motivation to become a director himself so he would have more creative control.

Releases
The film was released to theaters in the United States on March 24, 1939.

A VHS videotape was released on March 28, 1995; a region 1 DVD was released on April 22, 2008.

American Film Institute
 AFI's 100 Years...100 Laughs - Nominated
 AFI's 100 Years...100 Passions - Nominated

Remakes
The film was remade as Masquerade in Mexico (1945) with Dorothy Lamour.

In 2007, Universal Studios announced plans for a remake of Midnight to be shot in 2010, with  Michael Arndt as writer and Reese Witherspoon in the lead role. Universal currently owns the rights to the original version. However, the film has not gone into production.

References

External links
Midnight essay (PDF) by Kyle Westphal on the National Film Registry website 

 
 
 
 Still photo of the cast
 Midnight on Lux Radio Theater: May 20, 1940

1939 films
1939 romantic comedy films
1930s screwball comedy films
American black-and-white films
American romantic comedy films
American screwball comedy films
Films directed by Mitchell Leisen
Films scored by Friedrich Hollaender
Films set in France
Films set in Paris
Paramount Pictures films
United States National Film Registry films
Films with screenplays by Billy Wilder
Films with screenplays by Charles Brackett
1930s English-language films
1930s American films